Mass United Rush FC, formerly Mass United FC was an American soccer team based in Lynn, Massachusetts, United States.

History
Founded in 2009, the team made its debut in the Northeast – Atlantic Conference of the National Premier Soccer League (NPSL), the fourth tier of the American Soccer Pyramid, in 2011. In March 2011, Mass United FC, announced its 2011 NPSL schedule to be played at the City of Lynn’s Manning Field.

The club's colors were "United Blue", yellow and white.

The club also operated teams in the Bay State Soccer League (BSSL) and the Massachusetts State Soccer League (MSSL), as well as an indoor team in the MSSL.

Mass United FC declared that it will sit out the 2013 NPSL season. It was later announced the club would be part of the inaugural season of the relaunched American Soccer League in 2014, signing Trinibagonian Kareem Smith.  The league folded in 2017.

Season-by-season

References

External links
  (dead link)

2009 establishments in Massachusetts
American Soccer League (2014–2017) teams
Association football clubs established in 2009
National Premier Soccer League teams
Soccer clubs in Massachusetts
Sports in Lynn, Massachusetts